USS John A. Moore (FFG-19), eleventh ship of the  of guided-missile frigates, was named for Commander John Anderson Moore (1910–1944).  Ordered from Todd Pacific Shipyards, Los Angeles Division, San Pedro, California on 28 February 1977 as part of the FY77 program, John A. Moore was laid down on 19 September 1978, launched on 20 October 1979, and commissioned on 14 November 1981.

John A. Moore was the first ship of that name in the US Navy.  The namesake was commanding officer of the submarine  in 1943 and 1944.  Cdr. Moore received three awards of the Navy Cross during his command, the last posthumously after Grayback was sunk in February 1944.

TCG Gediz (F 495) 
Decommissioned and stricken on 1 September 2000, she was transferred to Turkey as that nation's TCG Gediz (F 495). As of 2015, she is still active in the service of the Turkish Navy.

In other media 
On the TV show MacGyver Season 1, Episode 11, the ship is visible in the opening scene, at the outfitting pier of Todd Pacific shipyard, along with two other FFG 7 ships under construction.

On the TV show JAG the ship was used multiple times. It was used in season 3 episode "Tiger, Tiger", where the ship played the part of a fictional frigate USS Stockdale (FFG-62). In the season 5, episode 7 "Rogue" the ship played the fictional frigate USS Ellyson (FFG-19).

In the TV show NCIS Episode 24 in Season 3 the ship is seen listed on a video monitor as FFG-19 when the Cape Fear Container Ship blows up.

References

External links 

MaritimeQuest USS John A. Moore FFG-19 pages

 

Oliver Hazard Perry-class frigates of the United States Navy
Ships built in Los Angeles
1979 ships
Ships transferred from the United States Navy to the Turkish Navy